XHPGVS-FM is a radio station on 88.9 FM in Guasave, Sinaloa, Mexico. It is owned by Grupo Promomedios and carries La Ke Buena grupera format from Radiópolis.

History
XHPGVS was awarded in the IFT-4 radio auction of 2017 and came to air in September 2018.

References

External links

Radio stations in Sinaloa
Radio stations established in 2018
2018 establishments in Mexico